David Walders (1879–1929) was an English professional footballer who played as a centre half in the Football League for Oldham Athletic and Burnley.

Career 
He started his career in non-league football with Barrow before being signed by Burnley in 1903. He played for Burnley for three seasons, scoring six goals in 97 games. He joined Oldham Athletic at the start of the 1907–08 season and played 122 games for the club before leaving in 1912 to sign for Southport Central. During the First World War, he returned to Burnley as a wartime guest player.

Personal life 
Walders' brother Jack also became a footballer.

References

1879 births
1929 deaths
Footballers from Barrow-in-Furness
English footballers
Barrow A.F.C. players
Burnley F.C. players
Oldham Athletic A.F.C. players
English Football League players
Burnley F.C. wartime guest players
Southport F.C. players
Association football wing halves
Footballers from Cumbria